The Europe/Africa Zone was one of the three zones of the regional Davis Cup competition in 1997.

In the Europe/Africa Zone there were four different tiers, called groups, in which teams competed against each other to advance to the upper tier. The top two teams in Group III advanced to the Europe/Africa Zone Group II in 1998, whereas the bottom two teams were relegated to the Europe/Africa Zone Group IV in 1998.

Participating nations

Draw
 Venue: Lokomotiv Tennis Club, Plovdiv, Bulgaria
 Date: 21–25 May

Group A

Group B

1st to 4th place play-offs

5th to 8th place play-offs

Final standings

  and  promoted to Group II in 1998.
  and  relegated to Group IV in 1998.

Round robin

Group A

Bulgaria vs. Malta

Estonia vs. Kenya

Bulgaria vs. Estonia

Kenya vs. Malta

Bulgaria vs. Kenya

Estonia vs. Malta

Group B

Algeria vs. Monaco

Cameroon vs. Moldova

Algeria vs. Moldova

Cameroon vs. Monaco

Algeria vs. Cameroon

Moldova vs. Monaco

1st to 4th place play-offs

Semifinals

Bulgaria vs. Moldova

Monaco vs. Estonia

Final

Bulgaria vs. Monaco

3rd to 4th play-off

Moldova vs. Estonia

5th to 8th place play-offs

5th to 8th play-offs

Kenya vs. Algeria

Malta vs. Cameroon

5th to 6th play-off

Kenya vs. Malta

7th to 8th play-off

Algeria vs. Cameroon

References

External links
Davis Cup official website

Davis Cup Europe/Africa Zone
Europe Africa Zone Group III